The West Morris Regional High School District is a limited purpose regional public high school district in New Jersey that serves  students from the surrounding Morris County communities of Chester Borough, Chester Township, Mendham Borough, Mendham Township and Washington Township. Elementary school students of the constituent municipalities attend separate K-8 school districts maintained by four of the five municipalities; Chester Borough and Chester Township schools are consolidated under the Chester School District and the remaining three municipalities each have their own districts (Mendham Borough Schools, Mendham Township Public Schools and Washington Township Schools).

As of the 2020–21 school year, the district, comprised of two schools, had an enrollment of 2,289 students and 186.4 classroom teachers (on an FTE basis), for a student–teacher ratio of 12.3:1.

The district is classified by the New Jersey Department of Education as being in District Factor Group "I", the second-highest of eight groupings. District Factor Groups organize districts statewide to allow comparison by common socioeconomic characteristics of the local districts. From lowest socioeconomic status to highest, the categories are A, B, CD, DE, FG, GH, I and J.

Both schools in the district are fully accredited by the New Jersey Department of Education, the Gilder Lehrman Institute of American History and the International Baccalaureate program. In August 2015, West Morris Central (ranked 151st) and Mendham (18th) were ranked among "America's Top High Schools 2015" by Newsweek magazine.

The West Morris Regional High School District is the only school district in New Jersey to offer students both the International Baccalaureate Diploma and Career programs.

West Morris Mendham High School was ranked as the seventh-most challenging public, non-magnet, non-charter high school in 2017 by The Washington Post and the most challenging such school in New Jersey.

History
The district was established in March 1956 and the "West Morris" name was adopted the following month. The district's first school opened in September 1958, at what is now West Morris Central, with 531 students in grades 9-11 in a building with 39 classrooms designed to accommodate a maximum enrollment of 1,200. 

The district originally included Mount Olive Township, until that municipality voted to leave the regional system. Students from Mount Olive Township attended West Morris Central High School until 1972.  West Morris Mount Olive High School, in Flanders, opened in 1972 and was operated by the regional district until the 1978-1979 school year, with the West Morris Mount Olive High School Class of 1978 being the last graduating class from this facility under the regional administration. The high school building and remaining faculty became part of the Mount Olive Township School District and is operated as Mount Olive High School.

In June 2015, a feasibility study requested by Chester Borough, Chester Township, Mendham Borough and Mendham Township was released that discussed potential restructuring of the West Morris Regional High School District, considering two different options. In one scenario, West Morris Mendham High School would be stripped away from the district to become a standalone regional high school for the Chesters and Mendhams. In the second scenario, the existing PreK-8 districts would be dissolved and combined with West Morris Mendham to create a consolidated PreK-12 district. In either scenario, Washington Township would take over West Morris Central High School and become its own PreK-12 district. Significant tax savings would have been achieved for the Chesters and Mendhams under both scenarios, with equivalent tax increases for Washington Township.

Schools
Schools in the district (with 2020–21 enrollment data from the National Center for Education Statistics) are:

Administration
Core members of the district's administration are:
Michael Ben-David, Superintendent
L. Douglas Pechanec, Business Administrator / Board Secretary

Board of education
The district's board of education, comprised of nine members, sets policy and oversees the fiscal and educational operation of the district through its administration. As a Type II school district, the board's trustees are elected directly by voters to serve three-year terms of office on a staggered basis, with three seats up for election each year held (since 2012) as part of the November general election. The board appoints a superintendent to oversee the day-to-day operation of the district. The nine seats on the board of education are allocated based on the populations of the constituent municipalities, with four seats assigned to Washington Township, two to Chester Township and one each to Chester Borough, Mendham Borough and Mendham Township.

References

External links
West Morris Regional High School District

West Morris Regional High School District, National Center for Education Statistics

Chester Borough, New Jersey
Chester Township, New Jersey
Mendham Borough, New Jersey
Mendham Township, New Jersey
Washington Township, Morris County, New Jersey
1958 establishments in New Jersey
School districts established in 1958
New Jersey District Factor Group I
School districts in Morris County, New Jersey